Tuscarawas may refer to:

 Tuscarawas, Ohio
 Tuscarawas County, Ohio
 Tuscarawas Township, Coshocton County, Ohio
 Tuscarawas Township, Stark County, Ohio
 Tuscarawas River